This is a list of shopping malls in Greece, listed in alphabetical order, by region.

Greece
Shopping malls